Kodumudi is a panchayat town and taluk headquarters of Kodumudi taluk in erode district at state of Tamil Nadu, India. Kodumudi has an average elevation of 144 metres (472 feet). Also Kodumudi is an tourism spot. The holy Kaveri river and Magudeswarar temple in Kodumudi attracts thousands of pilgrims daily across South India.

Demographics 
As of the 2001 India census, Kodumudi had a population of 12,669. Males constituted 50% of the population, and females 50%. Kodumudi has an average literacy rate of 70%, higher than the national average of 59.5%; male literacy is 77%, and female literacy is 62%. In Kodumudi, 8% of the population is under 6 years of age.

Economy
The economy is predominantly based on agriculture and tourism. Agriculture with turmeric and sugarcane being the main crops. There are large number of ricemills in and around Kodumudi and TNPL paper mills is near Kodumudi.

Culture 
Magudeswarar Temple, Kodumudi, Veera Narayana Perumal and Brama Deva Temple dedicated to Lord Shiva, Lord Vishnu, and Lord Brahma respectively. Various festivals are celebrated in the temples beginning with the Tamil New Year. During this ten days of ceremony, the festive deities Siva and Vishnu will be taken out on different types of Vahanas for darsan. Mahasivarathri is a grand saivaite festival.

The 18th day of Tamil month "Aadi", the deities will be taken to the river bank, bathed and are decorated with sandalwood powder. The Moola Nakshathra day of Tamil Month "Aavani" is celebrated as Pittu Thiruvizha and the Rohini Nakshathra day of the same month is the birthday of Lord Krishna. 

Muthu mari amman temple Festival is the famous function celebrated every year in the month of April–May. It's located in south pudhu palayam 2 km west from kodumudi. Annabishekam (abishekam with cooked rice) is performed to the deities on the Aswini nakshathra of "Aipasi" month and the six day Sasti festival is celebrated culminating with the marriage ceremony of Lord Muruga with Deivanai. The Krithika Nakshathra day of "Karthigai" is celebrated as "Karthikai Deepam" (day of light). The last Monday of this month is the day for the "108 Sankabishekam" (conches filled with Kaveri water).

The Thiruvathirai Nakshatra day of "Margazhi" is the day for Lord Nataraja. A procession for the festive deities is taken out for the public dharshan. The "Ekadhasi" is the day of entering in the gateway to reach "Vaikuntham". Pushpa Nakshathra of "Thai" month is the day of "Theerthavizha".

Transport
Kodumudi lies on the highway connecting Erode and Karur. Both train and bus facilities are available to reach Kodumudi.Kodumudi is also connected near by towns of kangeyam, Dharapuram, Tiruppur with buses. Nearest Airport is Coimbatore 105 km away by road. Kodumudi is well connected to major cities across Tamil Nadu through railways.

Notable personalities 
 K. B. Sundarambal, a renowned stage artist, singer and actress. First Tamil movie actor earned a six figure salary(100,000).
 K.M. Marimuthu, former vice chancellor, Bharathiar University, Coimbatore, first Indian to work for NASA
 K.S. Rajalingam, an awardee of "National award for Teachers" given by the President Sarvepalli Radhakrishnan in 1965 for initiating and establishing "Aramba Kalvi "in Kodumudi.
Happy Narayanan, a renowned Freedom Fighter who had once been a cellmate with Prime Minister Jawaharlal Nehru

References 

Cities and towns in Erode district